Kushiel's Chosen is a historical fantasy/alternate history novel by American writer  Jacqueline Carey. It is a sequel to Kushiel's Dart and the second novel in the Kushiel's Legacy series.

Synopsis 
In the novel, the journey of famed anguissette, Phèdre nó Delaunay, brings her all the way to Caerdicca Unitas, chasing after the path of the infamous traitor of Terre d'Ange, Melisande Shahrizai. Even still, the curse of her one true friend, Hyacinthe, haunts her. She has a long way to go if she will ever have the chance to free him from the curse that should have been hers. It is all she can do to keep madness at bay and try to stay one step ahead of Melisande.

Awards and nominations
Kushiel's Chosen was nominated for the 2003 Locus Award for Best Fantasy Novel.

References

External links
 

2002 American novels
American fantasy novels
Tor Books books